The Association of Literary Scholars, Critics, and Writers (ALSCW) was organized in 1994 as the Association of Literary Scholars and Critics by a group of over 400 scholars troubled by what they saw as an over reliance on post-modern theory in the academy. Among the founding members were Robert Alter, Joseph Brodsky, Denis Donoghue, John Hollander, Alfred Kazin, Mary Lefkowitz, Richard Poirier, Christopher Ricks and Roger Shattuck, "a Who's Who of the American literary establishment." Since 1999, the association has published a review, Literary Imagination.

Mission Statement 
The Association of Literary Scholars, Critics, and Writers (ALSCW) seeks to promote excellence in literary criticism and scholarship, and works to ensure that literature thrives in both scholarly and creative environments. We encourage the reading and writing of literature, criticism, and scholarship, as well as wide-ranging discussions among those committed to the reading and study of literary works.

History 
In 1994, a group of professors of literature, critics, and imaginative writers, tired of lamenting the overly politicized debate about literary study in the academy, joined together to create a different kind of organization, one aimed at combating this intellectual partisanship. The founders represented many unique perspectives and literatures from ancient to modern, but shared a common exasperation with the narrow theoretical and sociological discourse that seemed to have gained ascendancy in the United States, Canada, and the United Kingdom in the eighties and nineties. They wanted a renewed and enlarged field of study, more freedom of thought and expression, and more lively exchange between scholars and literary artists.

They represented no political agenda. Members ranged across a broad ideological (or non-ideological) spectrum. What held them together was the desire to create a forum where lovers of the word could carry on spirited literary debate and examine the arts of writing. ALSCW has made an important contribution to revitalizing the study of literature in the United States and beyond, and continues to do so.

Goals of the ALSCW 

 To provide space for encounters between scholars, critics, editors, and teachers, and fiction writers, poets, playwrights, and screenwriters
 To foster connections between the academic study of literature and the wider literary culture extending beyond the academy
 To sponsor and disseminate studies of curriculum and wider topics relating to literature (such as the teaching of composition, and the reading habits of a well-informed, critically alert citizenry; to create links between the teaching of literature in primary and secondary schools, and instruction in colleges and universities
 To encourage debate and exchange between and among scholars of ancient and modern literatures, and between and among those who study Western texts and the texts of every culture and continent in the world
 To explore the literary dimensions of other arts, including film, drama, painting, and music
 To support, encourage, and guide the study of literature.

Presidents 
1995 - Ricardo Quinones

1996 - Roger Shattuck

1997 - Robert Alter

1998 - Eleanor Cook

1999 - Austin E. Quigley

2000 - Mary K. Lefkowitz

2001 - John Hollander

2002 - James Engell

2003 - Stanley Stewart

2004 - Michael Valdez Moses

2005 - Rosanna Warren

2006 - Tom Clayton

2007 - Morris Dickstein

2008 - Christopher Ricks

2009 - Clare Cavanagh

2010 - Susan Wolfson

2011 - Greg Delanty

2012 - John Burt

2013 - Sarah Spence

2014 - John Briggs

2015 - Adelaide Russo

2016 - John Briggs

2017 - Ernest Suarez

2018 - Richard R. Russell

2019 - Kate Daniels

2020 - Lee Oser

2021 - David Bromwich

References

External links
 
 Caleb Crain.  The Shock of the Old, Lingua Franca, March 1999.
 Boris Kachka. On Closer Reading, Salon, 17 November 1999.
 ALSC News
 Literary Imagination

American writers' organizations